MHP may refer to:

Companies and organizations
Mieschke Hofmann und Partner, a management and IT consultancy owned by Porsche
Mississippi Highway Patrol
Montana Highway Patrol
Myronivsky Hliboproduct, a Ukrainian agricultural company
Nationalist Movement Party (Milliyetçi Hareket Partisi), a Turkish political party
Trade Union Federation for Professionals (formerly Vakcentrale Voor Middengroepen en Hoger Personeel), Netherlands

Other uses 
Human processor model or model human processor, a cognitive modeling method
Melissa Harris-Perry (TV series), an American current affairs and political commentary program
Minsk-1 Airport, Belarus (IATA code)
Multimedia Home Platform, an open middleware system standard for interactive digital television
Maritime Helicopter Project, which led to the development of the Sikorsky CH-148 Cyclone